Illinois Route 14 (IL 14) is a major east–west highway in southern Illinois. It runs from U.S. Route 51 south of Du Quoin to the New Harmony Toll Bridge over the Wabash River to State Road 66 at the Indiana state line.

Route description 
Illinois 14 runs mostly east–west from Du Quoin to New Harmony, Indiana.

IL 14 begins to travel eastward at US 51 in Du Quoin. The route then proceeds to intersect IL 184 in Mulkeytown, IL 148 in Christopher. It then traverses through Bruckner and West City. In West City, it then meets I-57 at a diamond interchange. After crossing over I-57, it then encounters IL 34 and IL 37 in Benton's public square around the Franklin County Courthouse. It then travels northward via IL 37 and soon branches off eastward. Continuing on, it then intersects IL 142 in McLeansboro. Also, it briefly runs concurrently with southbound IL 142.

Continuing eastward from McLeansboro, IL 14 then serves the Hamilton County State Fish and Wildlife Area. It then intersects US 45 south of Enfield. After that, it then reaches Carmi where it travels northeastward via IL 1. The concurrency continues like that until it reaches Crossville. At this point, IL 14 travels eastward towards the Wabash River. Just west of New Harmony, Indiana, the route ends at the former New Harmony Toll Bridge approach.

The eastern terminus of Illinois 14 is the New Harmony Toll Bridge, which used to bridge the states of Illinois and Indiana. The now-abandoned toll bridge is a four-span truss bridge that was built in 1931. It was built as a toll bridge, but has since been closed to automobile traffic since May 21, 2012.

History 
Illinois Route 14 followed the present-day routing of Illinois 14, from Du Quoin to Carmi. In 1937 it was extended east to its current terminus across from New Harmony, Indiana, replacing Illinois Route 139 in the process.

From 1947 to 1974, U.S. Route 460 replaced Illinois 14 between McLeansboro and the Indiana state line; after 1974, the extended routing of 1937 was restored.

Major intersections

References

External links 

 Illinois Highway Ends: Illinois Route 14

014
Transportation in Perry County, Illinois
Transportation in Franklin County, Illinois
Transportation in White County, Illinois
Transportation in Hamilton County, Illinois